Townline Lake is a  lake located in Mecosta County near the City of Big Rapids, Michigan. It is located in Colfax Township and Big Rapids Township. Grass Lake (Private-approximately 6 acres) is located in the NW section of Townline Lake and has an outlet which feeds Townline Lake. The outlet from Townline feeds Enzo Creek, which ultimately feeds into Ryan Creek. Fish species include bass, bluegill, northern pike, and crappie.

See also
List of lakes in Michigan

References

 

Lakes of Michigan
Bodies of water of Mecosta County, Michigan